Canistrum stabile is a species of air-breathing land snail, a terrestrial pulmonate gastropod mollusk in the family Bradybaenidae. This species is found in the Philippine Islands.

References

 
Gastropods described in 1841